Ebala is a genus of sea snails, marine gastropod mollusks in the subfamily Ebalinae, family Murchisonellidae.

Members of the genus Ebala are small (<4 mm) gastropods, the shells of which have a sinistral protoconch. The shell is transparent, sometimes with opaque spots. In contrast to most of the families in the parent superfamily Pyramidelloidea, they do possess a radula. They are found in tropical to temperate waters, often associated with sea grass beds (e.g.  Posidonia  and  Zostera).

Species
Species within the genus Ebala include:
 Ebala communis Bandel, 2005
 Ebala gradata (Monterosato, 1878)
 Ebala micalii (Peñas & Rolán, 2001)
 Ebala nitidissima (Montagu, 1803)
 Ebala pagodula (Yokoyama, 1927)
 Ebala pointeli (de Folin, 1868)
 Ebala scintillans A. Adams, 1861
 Ebala striatula (Jeffreys, 1856)
 Ebala torquata (Saurin, 1962)
 Ebala trigonostoma (de Folin, 1872)
 Ebala venusta (Melvill, 1904)
 Ebala vestalis A. Adams, 1861
 Ebala virginea A. Adams, 1860

References

Further reading

External links

Murchisonellidae
Taxa named by John Edward Gray